Giran is a village in the Kotli District of Azad Kashmir, Pakistan.  It is located at 33°21'0N  74°4'55 with an altitude of 844 metres (2772 feet). Neighbouring settlements include Bindian and Majwal.

References

Populated places in Kotli District